Legato is a musical articulation which indicates that notes are to be played smoothly.

Legato may also refer to:

Papal Legate, a representative of the Pope abroad
Lesbian and Gay Inter-University Organization, LEGATO, an LGBT organization in Turkey aimed at university students
EMC Legato NetWorker, a backup software from EMC Corporation
Legato Systems, a computer software storage company taken over in 2003 by EMC Corporation
Legato Bluesummers, a character in the anime and manga series Trigun
 

ru:Легато